Pick Lake is a small endorheic lake in Timmins, Cochrane District, Ontario, Canada.

See also
List of lakes in Ontario

References

Lakes of Cochrane District